Holderen is a lake on the border between Sweden and Norway. The  Norwegian part is located inside Blåfjella–Skjækerfjella National Park in the municipality of Snåsa in Trøndelag county. The  Swedish part is located in the municipality of Åre in Jämtland County.

See also
List of lakes in Norway

References

Snåsa
Lakes of Trøndelag
Norway–Sweden border
International lakes of Europe
Lakes of Jämtland County
Åre